Rami Greenberg (born 18 May 1978) is an Israeli Politician, currently serving as the Mayor of Petah Tikva.

Biography 
Greenberg was born in Neve Yarak, and grew up in Petah Tikva. at the age of 14, he was elected to serve as the chairman of the city's Likud youth, and at the age of 16, was elected to serve as the chair of the national Likud youth. During his time in the Israel Defense Forces, Greenberg served as an officer in the Duvdevan Unit. He subsequently joined the Israeli Police, serving as a detective. He subsequently studied Criminal law in the Academic Center for Law and Science, becoming a Lawyer.

From 2003 to 2006, Greenberg worked in Hod HaSharon's Department of Security, and served as a member of the Committee on Religious Affairs of the Drom HaSharon Regional Council. In 2012, he served as the Manager of the Department of Coordination and Oversight of Petah Tikva, until his removal by the Israeli Ministry of the Interior. He subsequently served as an advisor to Mayor Yitzhak Ohion.

In the 2013 Israeli municipal elections, Greenberg ran for Mayor of Petah Tikva under the Likud Party, but lost in the first round, coming in third place. as his party won two seats in the City Council, he became one of the party's two Councillors.

In the 2018 Israeli municipal elections, Greenberg ran for Mayor of Petah Tikva a second time, under his own party, called renewal (hithadshut) against Incumbent Mayor, Itzik Braverman. Greenberg won with 45% of the vote to Braverman's 36%, and was sworn into office on 20 November, 2018.

In 2021, amidst the COVID-19 pandemic, Greenberg announced that the city would examine a possible establishment of Pfizer's Israeli development center within the Petah Tikva Municipality

On 11 July 2022, Greenberg was investigated for Fraud, Breach of Trust, Extortion, Abuse of Power, Bribery and Conspiracy to commit a crime. On 10 August, he was arrested alongside the city's director and investigated a second time.

References 

People from Petah Tikva
Israeli lawyers
1978 births
Living people
Mayors of places in Israel